The 2022–23 CSA 4-Day Series was a first-class cricket competition taking place in South Africa from October 2022 to March 2023. It was the second edition of the post-franchise era and retained the two-division league format introduced the previous year, with the teams in each division unchanged.

The Division 2 teams of Limpopo and Mpumalanga were re-awarded first-class status in October 2022, meaning that unlike the previous year all matches played in the competition would be considered first-class cricket.

Points Table

Division 1

(C) Champions

Division 2

Fixtures

Division 1

Round 1

Round 2

Round 3

Round 4

Round 5

Round 6

Round 7

Round 8

Division 2

Round 1

Round 2

Round 3

Round 4

Round 5

Round 6

Round 7

Round 8

References

External links
 Series home at ESPN Cricinfo

South African domestic cricket competitions
CSA 4-Day Series
2022–23 South African cricket season